Mian Bashir Ahmed Larvi (November 1923 – 14 August 2021) was the eldest son of renowned saint Mian Nizam ud Din, the founder President of Gujjar-Jat Conference a socio political body established in 1932.  He was a politician and a Caliph of Islamic Sufi order (Naqshbandi, Majadadi, Larvi) in Jammu and Kashmir.
He was born in November 1923 in Pehalnar Wangath, Kangan Ganderbal Kashmir and died in August 2021 (Babanagri Wangat)  at the age of 97.

Early life and family 
He was born in November 1923 in Kashmir. His native name was "Baba Ji", his father Mian Nizam Din Larvi and his grandfather Baba Jee Sahib Larvi were also religious personalities in Kashmir. They are buried in Wanghat, Kashmir. Mian Bashir Sahib has two sons Mian Sarfraz Ahmed and Mian Altaf Ahmed. Mian Altaf Ahmed has served as Minister of Forestry, Ecology and Environment in Jammu and Kashmir. He had been a Cabinet minister in Jammu and Kashmir. Mian Nizam Ud Din larvi, Mian Bashir Ahmed larvi and Mian Altaf Ahmed never lost any election since they stepped into politics. Mian Bashir Ahmed declared his son Mian Altaf Ahmed as Wali E Ahed (Crown Caliph) successor on annual occasion of 8 June 2017, making him heir-designate to the throne.

Religious views 
He was a Muslim. He proselytizes the doctrines of Naqshbandi and (Majadadi) in order to advocate Sufism to his followers through Bayyet.His most renowned follower is Sheikh Al-Mashaikh Faisal ur rehman Usmani Qadri Suhrawardi, Chishti Qalandari Abul Alai Naqshbandi Mujaddidi Madari Shatari Ferdowsi Nizami Sabri Jahangiri Shazli .

Political career 
While on a pilgrimage to his ancestral (Sufi) saint's mausoleum in Hazara, Pakistan during the period of General Zia-ul-Haq, he was followed by a large group of people, Pakistani officials. In the wake of his influence in world, high security protocol was given and the Pakistani army was deployed. He was not allowed to go to his mausoleum due to security concerns and this was his reason for quitting politics.

He had been elected four times to the State Legislative Assembly of Jammu and Kashmir. He was closely associated with Sheikh Mohammad Abdullah, Mir Qasim and Bakshi Ghulam Mohammad, he was a minister in their cabinets. He had been closely associated with various top leaders in India including Mrs. Indira Gandhi, Rajiv Gandhi, Sheikh Mohammad Abdullah and Bakshi Ghulam Mohammad.

Mian Bashir Ahmed represented Kashmir issue in the United Nations to argue for peace. He had headed many delegations to international forums.

Indo-Pakistan Wars 
During the 1965 and 1971 Indo-Pakistan Wars he worked for peace and prosperity of the State and helped rehabilitate people in the tribal and border belts of Jammu and Kashmir. During the course of the ongoing insurgency since 1989 he worked to eradicate misconceptions between various communities.

Awards 
He was awarded the Padma Bhushan (the third highest civilian award), by the government of India on 26 January 2008 for his contribution to the society.

See also 
 Jammu and Kashmir

References 

1923 births
2021 deaths
Indian Sufis
People from Jammu and Kashmir
Recipients of the Padma Bhushan in public affairs
State cabinet ministers of Jammu and Kashmir
Kashmiri people
People from Ganderbal district